I'll Get Him Yet is a lost 1919 American silent comedy film starring Dorothy Gish and directed by Elmer Clifton. It was produced by D. W. Griffith under his production unit New Art Film. Paramount Pictures distributed the film.

Plot
As described in a film magazine, Susy Faraday Jones (Gish), daughter of a wealthy and none too indulgent father, owns a railroad that runs to the seashore and, in order to improve the schedule, she cuts off the town of Rivera as a stop. Two young men in her employ, her general manager and superintendent, each attempt to make love to her, much to that bored young woman's disgust. She meets Scoop McCready (Barthelmess), a reporter, in whom she takes an unusual interest. Soon they are engaged, but when he asks her father Bradford Warrington Jones (Fawcett) for her hand and is peremptorily ordered out of the house, he decides he will have nothing further to do with the rich girl. Susy does not have an easy time winning back Scoop, but after she finally agrees to give up every penny of her fathers wealth they get married and settle down in Rivera. The arrival at their cottage of her lawyer and two railroad officials causes unexpected complications with amusing attempts by her to hide the men in closets and under sofas until she finally explains their presence to her jealous husband.

Cast

References

External links

Glass slide 

1919 films
American silent feature films
Films directed by Elmer Clifton
Lost American films
Paramount Pictures films
1919 comedy films
1910s English-language films
American black-and-white films
Lost comedy films
1919 lost films
1910s American films
Silent American comedy films